Pallamkurru is a village in Katrenikona Mandal, East Godavari district,  Andhra Pradesh state, India.

References

Villages in East Godavari district